David Winter (born 23 February 1979) is a German actor. He appeared in more than forty films since 1994.

Selected filmography

References

External links 

1979 births
Living people
German male film actors